The 2014 National Invitation Tournament was a single-elimination tournament of 32 NCAA Division I teams that were not selected to participate in the 2014 NCAA tournament. The annual tournament started on campus sites for the first 3 rounds, with the Final 4 and Championship game being held at Madison Square Garden in New York City. The tournament began on Tuesday, March 18 and ended on Thursday, April 3. Minnesota won this tournament after being the 3rd Big Ten team in a row to make the NIT Finals (the two previous years a Big Ten team had lost the final game).

Participants

Automatic qualifiers
The following teams earned automatic berths into the 2014 NIT field having won their respective conference's regular season championship, but failing to win their conference tournament.

Southern from the Southwestern Athletic Conference (SWAC) was the league regular season champion and lost in their conference tournament but is ineligible for the NIT due to Academic Progress Rate (APR) sanctions. No team from the SWAC received an NIT autobid.

Arizona (Pac-12), Cincinnati (American), Kansas (Big 12), Michigan (Big Ten), Saint Louis (Atlantic 10), San Diego State (Mountain West) and Villanova (Big East) received automatic bids to the NIT, but did not accept them as they were selected as at-large teams in the 2014 NCAA Tournament.

At-large bids
The following 19 teams were also awarded NIT berths.

Seeds

Bracket
Games are played at higher seed unless noted

*#2 Illinois played at #7 Boston University and at #3 Clemson due to State Farm Center renovations.

Media
ESPN has exclusive television rights to all NIT games. They aired every single game across ESPN, ESPN2, ESPNU and ESPN3. Since 2011 Westwood One has held exclusive radio rights to the semifinals and championship. In 2014, John Tautges and Kelly Tripucka called these games for Westwood One.

See also
 2014 Women's National Invitation Tournament
 2014 NCAA Division I men's basketball tournament
 2014 NCAA Division II men's basketball tournament
 2014 NCAA Division III men's basketball tournament
 2014 NCAA Division I women's basketball tournament
 2014 NCAA Division II women's basketball tournament
 2014 NCAA Division III women's basketball tournament
 2014 NAIA Division I men's basketball tournament
 2014 NAIA Division II men's basketball tournament
 2014 NAIA Division I women's basketball tournament
 2014 NAIA Division II women's basketball tournament
 2014 College Basketball Invitational
 2014 CollegeInsider.com Postseason Tournament

References

National Invitation
National Invitation Tournament
2010s in Manhattan
National Invitation Tournament
Basketball in New York City
College sports in New York City
Madison Square Garden
National Invitation Tournament
National Invitation Tournament
Sports competitions in New York City
Sports in Manhattan